Mexico–Qatar relations are the foreign relations between Mexico and Qatar. Both nations are members of the United Nations.

History 
Diplomatic relations between two nations began on 30 June 1975, a few years after Qatar gained its independence from the United Kingdom. Since the establishment of diplomatic relations, relations between both nations were kept mainly through international organizations such as the United Nations. Over the past few years, cooperation between the two nations have increased. In 2014, Qatar opened an embassy in Mexico City. The gesture was reciprocated in 2015 with Mexico opening an embassy in Doha.

In November 2015, Emir of Qatar, Sheikh Tamim bin Hamad Al Thani paid an official visit to Mexico. During the Sheikh's visit, several agreements and memorandums were signed, including agreements on direct air service between the two nations, cultural and artistic agreement and cooperation in the energy sector, among others.

In January 2016, Mexican President Enrique Peña Nieto paid an official visit to Qatar. During his visit, both nations signed agreements on: education, science and community development; cultural and artistic cooperation, Mexican and Qatari news agencies cooperation; sports and Mexican companies promotion at the 2022 FIFA World Cup.

In August 2021, with the return of control of the Taliban in Afghanistan; Mexico in coordination with Qatar helped in the evacuation of over 100 Afghan refugees. Qatar Emiri Air Force planes arrived at Mexico City International Airport carrying groups of Afghan citizens.

In March 2022, Mexican Foreign Minister Marcelo Ebrard paid a visit to Qatar and met with his counterpart Qatari Foreign Minister Mohammed bin Abdulrahman bin Jassim Al Thani. While in Qatar, Ebrard discussed the upcoming FIFA World Cup being held in Qatar and attended the Doha Forum. In November of that same year, Foreign Minister Ebrard returned to Qatar and inaugurated the Mexico Center in Doha to provide consular protection and assistance to the nearly 100,000 Mexican fans who will attend the World Cup.

High-level visits

High-level visits from Mexico to Qatar
 Foreign Undersecretary Lourdes Aranda (2007, 2011)
 Foreign Minister Patricia Espinosa Cantellano (2010)
 Foreign Minister José Antonio Meade (2014)
 Foreign Undersecretary Carlos de Icaza (2014)
 President Enrique Peña Nieto (2016)
 Foreign Minister Marcelo Ebrard (March and November 2022)

High-level visits from Qatar to Mexico
 Sheikh Tamim bin Hamad Al Thani (2015)

Bilateral agreements
Both nations have signed several bilateral agreements such as an Agreement on the Avoidance of Double-Taxation and Tax Evasion (2014); Agreement on Air Services (2015); Agreement on Technical Cooperation (2015); Agreement on Artistic and Cultural Cooperation (2016); Agreement of Cooperation between the Mexican and Qatari News Agencies (2016); Memorandum of Understanding of Cooperation in the Energy Sectors (2016); Agreement on Educational Cooperation (2016); Memorandum of Understanding in Sports Cooperation (2016) and a Memorandum of Understanding between the Bank for Foreign Trade of Mexico (Bancomext) and the Doha Bank and Qatar National Bank (2016).

Trade
In 2018, total trade between the two nations amounted to US$83 million. Mexico's exports to Qatar include: trucks, vehicles and refrigerators. Qatar's exports to Mexico include: natural gas and aluminum alloy. Qatar is Mexico's 61st biggest trading partner and Mexico is Qatar's 28th biggest trading partner globally. Qatar Airways operates cargo services between Doha and Mexico City. Mexican multinational company Kidzania operates in Qatar.

Resident diplomatic missions 
 Mexico has an embassy in Doha.
 Qatar has an embassy in Mexico City.

References

 
Qatar
Bilateral relations of Qatar